Attila Piroska (born 11 April 1972) is a retired Romanian football midfielder.

Honours
Kispesti Honvéd
Magyar Kupa: 1995–96
Újpest
Magyar Kupa: 2001–02

References

1972 births
Living people
Romanian people of Hungarian descent
Romanian footballers
Liga I players
Liga II players
CFR Cluj players
CS Minaur Baia Mare (football) players
Nemzeti Bajnokság I players
Nemzeti Bajnokság II players
Budapest Honvéd FC players
Újpest FC players
Diósgyőri VTK players
Association football midfielders
Romanian expatriate footballers
Expatriate footballers in Hungary
Romanian expatriate sportspeople in Hungary
Sportspeople from Cluj-Napoca
Romanian sportspeople of Hungarian descent